Goaltending is a violation of the rules in the sport of basketball. It consists of certain forms of player interference with the ball while it is on its way to the basket.  It is goaltending if a player touches the ball when it is (a) in downward flight; (b) above the basket rim and within an imaginary cylinder projecting above the rim; (c) not touching the rim; and (varying at certain levels of the sport) after it has touched the backboard and has a chance of going in the hoop.  

Goaltending in this context defines by exclusion what is considered a legal block of a field goal. In high school and NCAA basketball, goaltending is also called when a player interferes with a free throw at any time in its flight towards the basket.

Effect
If goaltending is called for interference with a field goal, the shooting team is awarded the points for the field goal as if it had been made. The team who commits the violation then inbounds the ball at its baseline, the same as if it had conceded a basket. In high school and NCAA basketball, if goaltending is called on a free throw, the shooting team is awarded one point and a technical foul is called against the offending player. 

Goaltending is commonly confused with the related violation of basket interference (also called offensive goaltending) which occurs during an attempted field goal when a player touches the basket, the rim, or the ball when it is on the rim . Like goaltending, basket interference when committed by the defending team results in an award of points to the shooting team as if the attempted field goal had been made.

FIBA rules allow a defender to block any shot that is over the rim and the ball is on its upward flight.

The prohibition against goaltending was adopted by the NCAA in 1944 (and later by the NBL) specifically because of George Mikan. Prior to the advent of the high-jumping 6 ft 10 in (2.08 m) Mikan, goaltending was not addressed because it was thought physically impossible.

It is possible for goaltending to be called after the buzzer, although this is very rare. According to (W)NBA rules, play is not over until a shot taken before the buzzer is completed.  In the 2012–13 season Jermaine O'Neal was called for goaltending against the Houston Rockets after time expired; the 3-point shot counted, ending the game in a Phoenix Suns loss, 101–98.

References

Basketball penalties